Church of San Francisco or Iglesia de San Francisco (most often dedicated to St Francis of Assisi, in Spanish: San Francisco de Assisi) may refer to:

Chile 
 Church of San Francisco, Castro
 Iglesia de San Francisco (Chiu Chiu)
 Iglesia de San Francisco, Santiago de Chile

Colombia 
 Iglesia de San Francisco (Barranquilla), Barranquilla
 San Francisco Church, Bogotá, Bogotá
 San Francisco religious complex, Cali, Cali

Costa Rica 
 Iglesia de San Francisco de Asís (San José), San José

Ecuador 
 Iglesia y Convento de San Francisco, Quito

Mexico 
 Church of San Francisco, Madero Street, Mexico City
 Church of San Francisco (Puebla)
 Church of San Francisco Acatepec in San Andrés Cholula, Metropolitan area of Puebla

Philippines 
 San Francisco Church of Intramuros, an extant church located inside the walled city of Intramuros, Manila

Spain 
 Iglesia de San Francisco (Avilés)
 
 Iglesia de San Francisco (Ceuta)
 Church of San Francisco de Sales (Madrid)
 Iglesia de San Francisco de Asís (Santa Cruz de Tenerife)

Venezuela 
 Iglesia de San Francisco (Caracas), Caracas

See also in Italian 
 See Church of San Francesco (disambiguation)